Alfonso Pérez de Vivero (Valladolid, 1603 – Cambrai, 21 November 1661), Count of Fuensaldaña, was a Spanish soldier, nobleman and officeholder.

In 1632, when in his late twenties, he went to Flanders with a commission as captain of a company in the Army of Flanders. In 1635 he became governor of the citadel of Cambrai, and in 1636 Maestro de Campo. He was general of artillery on the French front in 1640–1641, general of cavalry on the Dutch front in 1643, general of infantry on the French front 1644–1646, and governor of arms (second-in-command of the whole army) 1648–1656. He was Governor of Milan from 1656 to 1660. In 1660 he retired from public life, withdrawing to Cambrai, where he died.

Sources
Fernando González de León, The Road to Rocroi: Class, Culture and Command in the Spanish Army of Flanders (History of Warfare 52; Brill, Leiden, 2009)

External links
Portrait engraved by Cornelius Galle the Younger.

1603 births
1661 deaths
Spanish generals
Governors of the Duchy of Milan
Spanish people of the Eighty Years' War